Robert Schmidt (August 2, 1913 – December 10, 1988) was an American businessman and politician.

Born in Kenosha, Wisconsin, Schmidt went to school in Greenfield, Wisconsin. He studied at West Allis Vocational School (Milwaukee Area Technical College) and political science at Marquette University. He owned a custard stand, liquor store, and was a tool and die maker. He served on the Greenfield Town Board and on the Milwaukee County Board of Supervisors. Schmidt was a Democrat. Schmidt served in the Wisconsin State Assembly from 1961 to 1967. At the time of his death, Schmidt owned a motel. He died of a stroke.

Notes

1913 births
1988 deaths
Politicians from Kenosha, Wisconsin
People from Greenfield, Wisconsin
Marquette University alumni
Milwaukee Area Technical College alumni
Businesspeople from Wisconsin
County supervisors in Wisconsin
Wisconsin city council members
Democratic Party members of the Wisconsin State Assembly
20th-century American politicians
20th-century American businesspeople